Union Hotel, also known as Barrow's Hotel, is a historic hotel located at Sackets Harbor in Jefferson County, New York.  It is a -story stone building, 51 feet by 69 feet, over a full basement. The original structure was built in 1817–1818. The interior features distinctive Federal woodwork.  It functioned as a hotel into the 1860s, then was used as a Masonic Lodge. In 1972 New York State acquired the building and rehabilitated it for use as the Visitor Center for the Sackets Harbor Battlefield State Historic Site. In July 2000, an addition was built and it was converted to serve as the Seaway Trail Discovery Center.

It was listed on the National Register of Historic Places in 1972.

References

External links
History of Union Hotel & the Masonic Order in Sackets Harbor, Town of Hounsfield, Jefferson Co., New York

Hotel buildings on the National Register of Historic Places in New York (state)
Federal architecture in New York (state)
Masonic buildings in New York (state)
Commercial buildings completed in 1818
Buildings and structures in Jefferson County, New York
National Register of Historic Places in Jefferson County, New York